The 2015 Liga de Elite started on 16 January 2015 and will ended on 21 June 2015.

League table

Match results

References

External links
Macau Football Association 

Campeonato da 1ª Divisão do Futebol seasons
Macau
Macau
1